Campichoeta obscuripennis  is a species of fly in the family Campichoetidae. It is found in the Palearctic.

References

External links
Images representing Campichoeta obscuripennis at BOLD

Campichoetidae
Insects described in 1830
Muscomorph flies of Europe